Otero County is the name of two counties in the United States:

 Otero County, Colorado 
 Otero County, New Mexico